Stitch is a fintech company operating in Africa, one of the biggest in open banking sphere. The company's headquarters are located in Cape Town, South Africa.

History 
In 2019, Stitch was founded in Cape Town, South Africa as Stitch Money.

In February 2021, Stitch raised $4 million in seed funding. The firm was initially focused on enabling businesses to access user financial accounts to view financial data.

In April 2021, the company began piloting its first payments product – Pay-ins.

In October 2021, the company raised a $2 million seed extension and announced expansion into Nigeria.

In February 2022, Stitch raised $21 million in Series A funding, led by New York-based long-term investment firm The Spruce House Partnership, for its API infrastructure and embedded finance platform.

In April 2022, Stitch launched LinkPay – the first payments API in Africa that tokenizes user financial accounts.   

In June 2022, Stitch launched its Payouts product, enabling businesses to send money – including payments to customers, vendors, suppliers, and employees.

References 

2019 establishments in South Africa
Technology companies established in 2019